Now That's What I Call Music! (often shortened to Now!) is a series of various artists compilation albums released in the United Kingdom and Ireland by Sony Music and Universal Music (Universal/Sony Music) which began in 1983. Spinoff series began for other countries the following year, starting with South Africa, and many other countries worldwide soon followed, expanding into Asia in 1995, then the United States in 1998.

The compilation series was conceived in the office of Virgin Records in London and took its name from a 1920s British advertising poster for Danish Bacon featuring a pig saying "Now. That's What I Call Music" as it listened to a chicken singing. Richard Branson, owner of Virgin, had bought the poster for his cousin, Simon Draper, to hang behind Draper's desk at the Virgin Records office. The pig became the mascot for the series, making its last regular appearance on Now That's What I Call Music 5, before reappearing in 2018, 2021 and 2022.

Original United Kingdom and Ireland series
The idea for the series was conceived in the office of Virgin Records in Vernon Yard, near Portobello Road in Notting Hill, London, by the head of Licensing and Business Affairs at Virgin Records (1979–1990) Stephen Navin, and General Manager (1983–1988) Jon Webster. The concept was taken to Simon Draper (managing director at Virgin Records) and then Peter Jamieson (managing director of EMI Records (1983–1986)). Jamieson had similar plans to launch such a compilation, and he agreed to the partnership. The deal was negotiated and finalised on Richard Branson's boat moored in Little Venice.

The series took its name from a 1920s British advertising poster for Danish Bacon featuring a pig saying "Now. That's What I Call Music" as it listened to a chicken singing. Richard Branson had bought the poster for his cousin, Simon Draper, to hang behind Draper's desk at the Virgin Records office. Branson wrote, "He was notoriously grumpy before breakfast and loved his eggs in the morning, so I bought him the poster, framed it and had it hung behind his desk." The pig became the mascot for the series, making its last regular appearance on Now That's What I Call Music 5, and made a reappearance on the cover of Now That's What I Call Music! 100 in 2018 and Now That's What I Call Music! 109 in 2021.

The first Now was released on 28 November 1983 and featured 30 UK hit singles from that year on a double vinyl LP or cassette. Although the compilation of recent hit songs into a single release was not a new concept (K-tel and Ronco, for example, had been issuing various-artist compilations for some years), this was the first time that two major record labels had collaborated on such a venture. Virgin agreed to a deal with EMI, which allowed a greater number of major hits to be included (the first album in the series included a total of "eleven number ones" on its sleeve). The album went to number one, and soon after, CBS/WEA's The Hits Album adopted a similar format to Now!. The two series co-existed for the rest of the 1980s, and when Universal (formerly PolyGram from Now 8 in 1986 through to Now 42 in 1999) joined the collaboration, the Now! series was more successful commercially. The Out Now series by MCA and Chrysalis was also established as a rival to the series, but was short-lived and lasted only two volumes.

By 1989, Now, Hits, and other various-artist compilation albums were occupying such a large fraction of the UK Albums Chart that a separate UK Compilation Chart was created to restrict the Albums Chart to releases by a single act.

The rate of release settled very quickly to three per year: one release around late March/early April, another around late July and a third around late November. Over a hundred "main series" (not including spin-off and special edition) albums have been released to date. The UK series has followed a double-album format throughout the series (many other foreign franchises of the Now! series are only released on one disc), now exploiting the capacity of the CD to include between 40 and 46 tracks over two discs. Since November 2005 (Now That's What I Call Music! 62), the Now! series have only been released on CD and digital download formats. Previously, the series had been available on vinyl, cassette and MiniDisc, until these formats declined in popularity.

Peter Duckworth and Steve Pritchard have been managing the Now! brand since NOW 17. Mark Goodier has voiced the Now! adverts since Now That's What I Call Music! 21 in 1992, when he worked for BBC Radio 1, with the exception of Now That's What I Call Music! 95 in 2016, which was voiced by Matt Edmondson due to Goodier suffering a stroke around that time. Ashley Abram of Box Music compiled the albums from Now That's What I Call Music II in 1984 through to Now That's What I Call Music! 81 in 2012. Jenny Fisher took over as the compiler beginning with Now That's What I Call Music! 82.

On 23 October 2013, the NOW Music television channel was launched in the UK. Targeting a broad age group, the channel used to play current popular music in the daytime and hits from its 30-year back catalogue in the evenings. It was renamed to Now 80s on 27 December 2016. Its success has led to two more branded channels exploring decades, Now 90s on 27 December 2017, replacing Chilled TV, and Now 70s on 27 December 2019, replacing Total Country.

Records/achievements
The most successful volume to date is 1999's Now That's What I Call Music! 44, which sold 2.3 million copies and remains the biggest-selling various artists compilation album in the UK. 2008's Now That's What I Call Music! 70 sold 383,002 units in the first week of sales, the biggest ever first week sale of any Now album.

Most featured artists
As of mid April 2022, the most featured artists are Robbie Williams with 30 singles, and Kylie Minogue who also features 30 singles. Followed by Calvin Harris 29, David Guetta with 28, Rihanna with 27, Katy Perry with 22 and Girls Aloud with 21. This does not include any uncredited appearances in groups or on charity records.

Formats
Although the albums started out on only vinyl records and cassette tapes, the formats on which the albums have been released have changed over the years:
Unabridged (double CD) full versions of Now were first available starting with Now That's What I Call Music 10 in 1987, although a version of Now 4 was released on CD featuring songs that had appeared on the vinyl and cassette configurations of Nows 2, 3 and 4. Now That's What I Call Music 8 (17 tracks) and Now That's What I Call Music 9 (16 tracks) were released as single disc CDs in 1986 and 1987, respectively. A "Special Collectors Edition" of Now 1 was released on CD in 2009 as a digipak, 2015 and again in 2018 as a jewel case album. 
Vinyl editions of the main series ended in 1996 with Now That's What I Call Music! 35, though spin-offs like NOW presents the 70s was being released as a five LP vinyl boxset by Sony/EMI in 2021.
MiniDiscs started with Now That's What I Call Music! 43 in 1999 and ended with Now That's What I Call Music! 48 in 2001.
The first Now album to be released as a digital download was Now That's What I Call Music! 62 in 2005 across online music stores.
Cassette tapes ceased in 2006 with the final cassette being Now That's What I Call Music! 64.
VHS tapes were released as companions to all the Now! albums from the first volume through Now That's What I Call Music! 20, except for Now! That's What I Call Music 19. They contained music videos, some for tracks featured on the accompanying album and others for tracks not on the album. Some of the earlier volumes were also released on Betamax and for some volumes laserdiscs were also released.

Spin-offs

In addition to the main Now That's What I Call Music series, there have been a number of spin-off compilations in the UK using the name, including:
Now Dance – a series in its own right, these compilations originally consisted of 12" mixes of current hits. They now focus on radio mixes of recent dance hits, and a Very Best of Now Dance compilation has been released.
At least two different series of year-by-year "retrospective" compilations, covering 1983 to 1995 and 1980 to 1999, respectively were issued in the 1990s with the latter series known as Now! - The Millennium Editions. In June 2021, the Now Yearbook series was launched. Starting with 1983, the series will cover each year in depth via compilations released on a four-CD boxset and 3 disc coloured vinyl LP set by Now Music, with a tie-in programme (featuring videos from the year in question) appearing on their Freeview TV channel. The original Now Yearbook ’83 could be initially ordered as a special book-style CD boxset, with the title joined a few months later by a standard CD boxset called Now Yearbook ’83 Extra which promised '60 more essential hits from 1983', and tracks like Kenny Everett's "Snot Rap", Roman Holliday's "Don’t Try To Stop It" and "Friday Night" by The Kids From Fame. 
At least five "best-of" compilations including selected songs from the entire Now! series. Now Decades, Now Years,  Now 25 Years, Now 30 Years, and Now That’s What I Call Now! (100 Hits From 100 Nows) are these five albums, but there have been other albums, like Now No. 1's, which also cover the entire Now! series.
At least one tie-up with Smash Hits magazine in 1987, called Now Smash Hits. (Smash Hits later went on to release their own compilations).
Christmas releases, including some classic Christmas favourites.
Genre-based spin-offs are normally issued in the 2020s as 4CD sets, though Now That's What I Call Punk & New Wave is due to be issued as a limited edition 2LP neon pink vinyl set with 34 songs from the standard compilation's 89 tracks.
Sometimes considered a spin-off, video releases, including video cassette editions of many early Now! compilations, and (more recently) yearly DVD video releases.
Other releases include Now Karaoke and the interactive DVD Now That's What I Call A Music Quiz.
A series of compilation video games (for the Commodore 64, among other home computers) were released in the mid-1980s by Virgin Games with the name Now Games.
A Wii game was released on 25 November 2011 named Now That's What I Call Music! - Dance and Sing. It features tracks by recent artists, including Alexandra Burke, Jessie J, Lady Gaga, Rihanna, Tinie Tempah, Calvin Harris and Plan B. It features a Dance Mode, Sing Mode and Career Mode.

Record labels
The record labels which make up the UK series have changed over the years but have always been controlled by EMI and Virgin Records, although Virgin Records' logo was last featured on Now! 74 as the companies became merged. The current entity controlling the series is Now That's What I Call Music LLP, a joint venture between Sony Music and Universal's EMI label (the old EMI/Virgin/PolyGram bloc). 
Virgin Records were a label from Now 1 to Now 74. Until Now That's What I Call Music! 61, they used just the "Virgin" logo. From that volume onwards, the "Virgin Records" logo was used.
EMI were a label on all volumes. Until Now 75, the logo they used was simply the "EMI" logo. From that volume onwards, "EMI TV"'s logo was used instead.
PolyGram were a label from Now That's What I Call Music 8 to Now That's What I Call Music! 42.
Universal Music were a label from Now That's What I Call Music! 43 onwards as a result of acquiring the Polygram label.
Box Music Ltd. were involved between 1984 and 2012, but it was Now That's What I Call Music! 26 onwards that their logo was used on the packaging.
Also, the "Music from EMI" logo was used Now That's What I Call Music! 62 until Now 85 when they used the Sony label instead, until Now 90 when they stopped using labels on the main series.
Sony BMG's logo was also used on the special edition of the album, Now! No.1s
Due to the Universal Music Group's purchasing of EMI in 2012, a share of the Now albums' rights were transferred over to Sony Music Entertainment (a partner in the original Hits Album brand). UMG used the brand of their catalogue subsidiary Universal Music TV (UMOD) on the series before reverting to the EMI brand by the 2020s on some of the Now spin-offs like Now Yearbook ’83 Extra, Now That’s What I Call Christmas and the re-issued Now That’s What I Call Music 10.
 Now That's What I Call Disney was released under the Walt Disney Records label.

Series in other countries

Numerous different versions of the Now! brand exist in other parts of the world, including:

Arabia (under the name Now That's What I Call Arabia)
Argentina
Asia region
Australia
Canada
China
Czech Republic
Denmark
Egypt
France
Finland
Greece
Hungary
Israel
Italy
Japan
Korea (under the name Now That's What I Call K-Pop)
Mexico
Netherlands
New Zealand
Norway
Philippines
Poland
Portugal
Russia
Singapore (also sold in neighboring Malaysia)
South Africa
Spain
Turkey
United Kingdom
United States

Africa

South Africa
Volume one was released in 1984 (a year after the original UK series launched). Now 50, released in November 2008, was issued as a double CD in commemoration of 25 years of Now! albums in South Africa, and double compact discs are every 3 albums through Now 80 released in November 2018 as the series switched to 2 in 2019, then one in 2020, the most recent Now Album to include a double disc was Now 83 this was also the last physical album to be released as further volumes are only available on streaming platforms. As of 2 September 2005, there has also been a Now DVD series.

Asia

South East Asia
This edition was released in Indonesia, Malaysia, Singapore, Taiwan, Hong Kong, Thailand etc. The first Asian Now That's What I Call Music! was released in 1995.

The series is often called Now Asia since Now 1 and Now 2 are from EMI Hong Kong, Now 3 and Now 4 are from EMI Malaysia, Now 7 is from EMI Taiwan and Now 5, Now 6 and Now 8 are from EMI Asia. The Indonesian versions of the albums are slightly different from the Asian ones.

EMI Asia has also released Now Dance (2000), Now The Essential Collection (2003), Now + volume 1 (2004) and Now + volume 2 (2005).

EMI Indonesia has released Now Jazz (2007) and Now Arabia (2011).

China
Following its introduction in China, the Now! series has enjoyed great success, with a new compilation released approximately every three to four months. Each album contains current and recent hit singles from Chinese artists signed to EMI or Polydor, and from British and Australian pop acts such as Kylie Minogue, Sophie Ellis-Bextor, Sugababes or Robbie Williams.

Israel
Now has been seen in Israel, starting in 1999. The first three albums are double discs. Now 4 was the first single disc and the rest in the series are also single disc.

South Korea
Now started in South Korea on 22 March 2015. The first three albums were double discs, under the name Now That's What I Call K-Pop.

Europe (in addition to UK & Irish series)

Czech Republic
Now Hity is the Czech version of the Now That's What I Call Music! series. Originally branded under the main family name, it was changed to Now Hity later in the run. There have also been spin-offs like Now! 2006.

Denmark
Now Music is a Danish record label set up especially to release Now That's What I Call Music! albums in Denmark. As well as the Now regular series as of November 2007 they are up to the nineteenth release. There have also been spin-offs including Now Big Hits, Now Christmas, Now Summer, Now Clubbing, Now Dance and Now Hip Hop.

Robbie Williams is the artist to be featured the most times in the regular Danish Now series, just as he also is in the UK Now! series. He has appeared ten times in the Danish series.

Finland
The first Finnish Now That's What I Call Music was released in 2003 where it replace the Absolute Hits series. The albums are released as double discs. There have also been spin-offs including Now That's What I Call Music Pop Hits and Now That's What I Call Dance Music.

France
In France the Now series is called Now! Hits Référence. There have been released Now! Hits Référence 1-7 and Now! Hits Référence 2005, 2006 and 2007.

Greece
In Greece the Now series is called Now: Αυτά Είναι Τα Hits Σήμερα! ("Now These Are the Hits Today!"). Now 1 was released in 2002 and Now 2010 was released in 2009. In 2015 (early summer), Now  that's what i call music 2015 was released as a follow-up to the compilation series. There have also been released some Now Dance albums in Greece.

Netherlands
The Now series started in the Netherlands back in 1984 as Now This Is Music and a couple of spin-offs, such as Now Dance, a Christmas compilation (Now This Is Xmas) and several year-end compilations. The series ran from 1984 to 1989, ending with its 11th installment. The series was released on the EVA label, a joint venture of the Dutch branches of EMI, Sony and Ariola (later: BMG Ariola, a subsidiary of BMG/Warner Music Group). A second series under the same title started in 1997, but only two albums were released.

Norway
The Norwegian series of Now That's What I Call Music! is a joint venture by the Norwegian branches of Universal Music, Sony Music, EMI Music and Warner Music. Prior to 2009 they released two independent series called Absolute Music by EVA Records (EMI and Warner Music) and McMusic (Sony Music Entertainment AS and Universal Music Group AS).

The first issue of Now That's What I Call Music! in Norway was released in November 2009.

Portugal
The Now series in Portugal is a joint-venture between the three major international publishers present in Portugal – EMI, Sony and Universal. In 2010, it was announced that total sales of the series, not counting the extra editions, topped one million copies in Portugal. Through Volume 21 of the series, the multi-volume sets have included 414 national and international artists and a total of 787 different songs, ranking in an impressive four gold and 19 platinum records.

The first album released in Portugal was NOW 99 and released by EMI on 2 December 1999. From the Now 2 through Now 21, the compilation was always done on a rotation system among the three music companies. In addition to these volumes, the series includes six dance editions, a DVD and the tenth anniversary commemorative edition, NOW 10 ANOS, released by EMI in December 2009. On 26 April 2010, Now Mix 2010 was released, which includes dance versions of popular songs in a non-stop mix format..

The most recent editions, Now 32, was released in November 2017.

Spain
Now has also been seen in Spain under the name of Now Esto sí es música ("Now This Is Music"). The original series included six releases from 1984 to 1989. The compilation album is released as a double CD album. Later the series started over with Now Esto Es Música 1, which included songs from artists like Juanes, Enrique Iglesias, George Michael, Sheryl Crow, Tiziano Ferro, Alex Ubago, Las Ketchup and U2. Now Esto Es Música 2003 has also been released. But due to the lukewarm success, no more albums were released since 2004.

However, in late 2009, EMI Music released the album "Now Dance" in Spain, which contains all the biggest dance hits in Spain during 2009, including Lady Gaga, David Guetta featuring Kelly Rowland, The Black Eyed Peas and Katy Perry, among others.

North America

Canada
The first installment of the product line into Canada was released in 1988. The second installment of the product line was released in 1995. Beginning with the second installment of the series, repertoire was licensed from Universal, Warner and EMI. Songs from Sony and BMG was not included on any editions of the series in Canada. Since the second installment of the series, Universal, Warner and EMI have formed a joint venture together and generally take turns to release the series. From the years of 1996 to 2009 the series released an annual compilation usually in the late summer months. However, beginning with Now 15, there have been two editions each year which usually take place in early winter and late summer.

Mexico
Now has also been seen in Mexico, with at least ten releases. The track listings on the Mexican albums are only slightly different from those of the Argentine ones.

United States
The series of Now! albums was brought to the United States in 1998 by Bob Mercer. The most recent album in the series, Now That's What I Call Music! 85, was released on February 3, 2023.

Collectively, the Now! compilations have sold extremely well in the U.S. Each of the first 29 volumes received at least a platinum certification, and 18 albums from the series have reached number one on the Billboard 200 albums chart, more than any individual recording artist except the Beatles. However, recent releases have not sold as well, with Now That's What I Call Music! 77 selling only an estimated 7,500 copies in its first week, compared to the 621,000 copies Now! 7 sold in its debut week in July 2001.

The most successful album in the series to date is Now That's What I Call Music! 5, which was certified 4× Platinum by the RIAA in 2000. Since the fourth volume, the compiler for the U.S. series has been Jeff Moskow.

Various "special edition" Now! albums have also been released, such as Now Esto Es Musica! Latino, Now That's What I Call Motown, and Now That's What I Call the 1990s. Since the release of Volume 32 in 2009, albums have included bonus "Now What's Next" tracks by not-yet-fully-established artists at the expense of additional hit songs. The 2020s have seen the Now brand being introduced to streaming services such as Spotify.

Oceania

Australia
The Australian series is a single disc edition and began in 2002, as a replacement for the long-running 100% Hits brand. The series is a joint venture between EMI Music Australia and Warner Music Australia.

Now 01  appeared in July of that year, followed by Now 02 in time for Christmas 2002. 2003's Now 03 came with a bonus DVD; the first standalone DVD release (Now Vision 2004) appeared the following year. 
Now 08 was the last of this series however a second series took over this time with seasons instead of volumes for example Now Winter 2005, Now Spring 2005. Now Summer 2014 was the last in the second series, on the third series the season was dropped and instead the year and volume is used for example Now 2014 Vol.1, Now 2019 Vol.1 was the last in the series.

Other notes about the series
In 2006 the Now Summer 2007 was the first double disc edition in the Australian series. In 1994, four albums were released, all with the title Now That's What I Call Music - 100% then Dance, Ballad, Rap or Alternate.

New Zealand
Now That's What I Call Music! has released 61 physical albums since 1997, the latest one released July 2020 and further albums were released on streaming platforms only. The series is compiled in co-ordination with New Zealand's top record companies. The series is one of the highest selling compilations in New Zealand music history (RIANZ) with multi-platinum album sales. Prior to this, there was an unrelated Now That's What I Call Music Series by Warner Bros. Records which only released three albums from 1992 to 1993.

South America

Argentina
Now has been seen in Argentina, with at least nine releases. The track listings on the Argentine Now albums are only slightly different from those of the Mexican ones.

See also
 Now That's What I Call Music! discography

Further reading

 Pete Selby, Andy Healing & Louise Ward (2014) The NOW THAT’S WHAT I CALL MUSIC Book. Simon & Schuster.

References

External links
 
 Official American website

Compilation album series
Pop compilation albums